Corythangela fimbriata is a moth of the family Batrachedridae. It is found in Western Australia.

The wingspan is about 10 mm.

References

Moths of Australia
Batrachedridae
Moths described in 1996